Halopegia is a genus of plants native to tropical Africa, Madagascar, and tropical southeast Asia (Indochina,  Java). Three species are recognized as of April 2014:

Halopegia azurea (K.Schum.) K.Schum. in H.G.A.Engler (ed.), Pflanzenr., IV, 48: 50 (1902). - Africa
Halopegia blumei (Körn.) K.Schum. in H.G.A.Engler (ed.), Pflanzenr., IV, 48: 51 (1902). - Java + Indochina
Halopegia perrieri Guillaumin, Bull. Mus. Natl. Hist. Nat. 32: 403 (1926). - Madagascar

References

Marantaceae
Zingiberales genera